Silvio Orsini was an Italian film actor of the silent and early sound era.

Selected filmography
Red Love (1921)
 Television (1931)
 Naples in Green and Blue (1935)

References

Bibliography 
 Waldman, Harry. Missing Reels: Lost Films of American and European Cinema. McFarland, 2000.

External links 
 

Year of birth unknown
Year of death unknown
Italian male film actors